Club Petrolero is a Bolivian football club from Yacuiba that currently plays in the Liga de Fútbol Profesional Boliviano. Their home ground is Estadio Provincial de Yacuiba.

Honours

National
Liga Nacional B:
2011–12
Runners-up:
2013–14

Regional
Asociación Tarijeña de Fútbol: 2
2008, 2011
Runners-up: 2009

External links
 

Football clubs in Bolivia
Association football clubs established in 2000
2000 establishments in Bolivia